The Society of Colonial Wars is a hereditary society composed of men who trace their descents from forebears who, in military, naval, or civil positions of high trust and responsibility, by acts or counsel, assisted in the establishment, defense, and preservation of the mainland American colonies of Great Britain.

General information
The General Society presently comprises some thirty-two constituent state societies.  The organization was founded in New York in 1892, originally as a state society.  The General Society was founded in 1893.

The total membership of state societies has for many years remained in the range of 4,000 to 4,500.  Approximately 21,000 men have joined the organization during its history, including many prominent Americans.  Members are typically well-educated and professionally accomplished.

The Society has long sought to improve public awareness of the importance of colonial events and individuals in the shaping of America.  A number of monuments, plaques, and other markers have been installed by the Society at prevenient sites.  The Society also funds research and educational initiatives of colonial relevance.  In recent years, the goal of improving understanding of the colonial period has additionally been addressed by Samuel Victor Constant Fellowships, awarded annually for postgraduate study of colonial American history.

The Society of Colonial Wars is listed as an approved lineage society with the Hereditary Society Community of the United States of America.

Membership qualifications
To be eligible for membership in the Society an individual must be a male over age 18 who is lineally descendant from a person who served either in a military capacity or held public office in one of the original 13 colonies prior to the American Revolution.

Notable members

Government officials
 Sherman Adams – Governor of New Hampshire and White House Chief of Staff.
 Thomas R. Ball – U.S. Congressman.
 Henry M. Baker – U.S. Congressman.
 William W. Barbour – United States Senator.
 Franklin Bartlett – U.S. Congressman.
 James Phinney Baxter – Mayor of Portland, Maine.
 Howard R. Bayne  Member of the New York State Senate.
 Robert W. Bingham – United States Ambassador to the United Kingdom.
 Henry S. Boutell – U.S. Congressman.
 Private Morgan Bulkeley, USV – Governor of Connecticut, United States Senator and insurance executive.
 Melville Bull – U.S. Congressman.
 Colonel Louis R. Cheney, CTM – Mayor of Hartford, Connecticut.
 Colonel Samuel Pomeroy Colt, RIM – Rhode Island Attorney General, militia officer, businessman and politician.
 Calvin Coolidge - 30th President of the United States
 Chauncey Depew – United States Senator.
 Lieutenant Commander Clarence D. Dillon, USN – Secretary of the Treasury.
 Colonel Richard Thomas Walker Duke, CSA – United States Senator
 Captain Henry A. du Pont, USA – United States Senator.
 Brigadier General Elisha Dyer, Jr., RIM – Governor of Rhode Island.
 Charles P. Farnsley – U.S. Congressman.
 Ignatius Cooper Grubb – Delaware Secretary of State
 Major General Curtis Guild, Jr., MVM – Governor of Massachusetts and militia general.
 Carter H. Harrison  – Mayor of Chicago.
 Henry Oscar Houghton– Mayor of Cambridge, Massachusetts.
 Hamilton Fish Kean – United States Senator.
 Charles Dean Kimball – Governor of Rhode Island and U.S. Congressman.
 Levi P. Morton – Vice President of the United States and Governor of New York.
 Truman Handy Newberry – Secretary of the Navy, United States Senator.
 Captain Claiborne Pell, USCGR – United States Senator.
 Thomas C. Platt – United States Senator.
 L. Bradford Prince – Governor of New Mexico Territory and New York State Senator.
 Josiah Quincy – Mayor of Boston.
 Stanley F. Reed – U.S. Supreme Court associate justice.
 Henry Roberts – Governor of Connecticut.
 Elihu Root – U.S. Secretary of State and Secretary of War.
 Colonel Edward Curtis Smith – Governor of Vermont
 H. Alexander Smith – United States Senator.
 Henry Stockbridge, Jr. – United States Representative.
 Paul Suttell – Chief Justice of the Rhode Island Supreme Court.
 Henry L. Wilson – Ambassador.
 Charles S. Whitman – Governor of New York
 Roger Wolcott – Governor of Massachusetts
 Urban A. Woodbury – Governor of Vermont
 J. Butler Wright – Ambassador.
 Rear Admiral Walter Wyman, MHS – Surgeon General of the United States.

Military officers
 Admiral of the Navy George Dewey – Hero of the Battle of Manila Bay.
 Vice Admiral Stuart H. Ingersoll – President of the Naval War College.
 Major General John R. Brooke – Veteran of the Civil War and Spanish–American War.
 Major General Francis Fessenden – Civil War general.
 Major General William B. Franklin – Union Army officer and Vice President of Colt Firearms.
 Major General Frederick Dent Grant – Son of President Ulysses S. Grant.
 Major General Robert E. Noble, MC – Career Army medical officer.  Recipient of the Distinguished Service Medal.
 Major General Joseph Wheeler – Confederate Lieutenant General, U.S. Army Major General and Congressman.
 Major General Leonard Wood – Medal of Honor recipient and U.S. Army Chief of Staff.
 Rear Admiral John R. Bartlett, USN – Oceanographer.
 Rear Admiral William G. Buehler - Veteran of the Civil War and Spanish-American War.
 Rear Admiral Richard Worsam Meade, USN
 Rear Admiral Joseph B. Murdock, USN
 Rear Admiral Francis A. Roe – Career Navy officer.
 Rear Admiral Aaron Ward – Career Navy officer.
 Brevet Major General Adelbert Ames – Governor of and Senator from Mississippi.
 Brevet Major General Absalom Baird – Civil War general and Medal of Honor recipient.
 Brevet Major General Isaac S. Catlin – Civil War veteran and Medal of Honor recipient.
 Brevet Major General Theodore S. Peck – Civil War veteran and Medal of Honor recipient.
 Brigadier General Charles Wheaton Abbot, Jr. – Adjutant General of Rhode Island.
 Brigadier General Richard Napoleon Batchelder – Medal of Honor recipient.
 Brigadier General Joseph Lancaster Brent, CSA – California State Assembly member.
 Brigadier General Edgar S. Dudley
 Brigadier General Morris Cooper Foote
 Brigadier General James Forney, USMC
 Brevet Brigadier General Charles R. Brayton – Political boss of Rhode Island.
 Colonel William Seward Webb – Inspector General of the Vermont Militia.
 Captain Vincent Astor, USNR – Husband of Brooke Astor.
 Captain Alfred Brooks Fry, USNR – Marine engineer.
 Brevet Colonel Johnston de Peyster – Union Army officer.
 Commander Guy Castle, USN – Medal of Honor recipient.
 Lieutenant Colonel John Jacob Astor IV, USV – Heir to the Astor fortune.  Died on the RMS Titanic.

Others
 Francis Ellingwood Abbot – Philosopher and theologian
 Willard Bartlett –  Chief Judge of the New York Court of Appeals
 Henry L. P. Beckwith, Jr. – Genealogist and historian
 George Madison Bodge – Author and historian
 John Nicholas Brown I – Philanthropist
 John Coolidge – Business executive
 Alexander Hamilton – Episcopalian priest
 John B. Hattendorf – Maritime historian
 Rowland Hazard III – Business executive
 Jack Holt – Actor
 Norman Isham – Architectural historian
 Lawrence Park – Art historian, architect, and genealogist
 William Stevens Perry – Second Episcopalian bishop of the Diocese of Iowa.
 Alexander Hamilton Rice Jr. – Explorer
 Henry Lyttleton Savage – Princeton University professor
 William Watts Sherman – Socialite
 Henry A. Stearns (1825–1910) – Rhode Island industrialist
 John Austin Stevens – Founder of the Sons of the Revolution
 Woodbridge Strong Van Dyke II — MGM Film Director
 Henry Benjamin Whipple – First Episcopal bishop of Minnesota.
 Theodore Salisbury Woolsey – Yale law professor.

See also
 Children of the American Revolution
 Daughters of the American Revolution
 Sons of the American Revolution
 Sons of the Revolution
 Society of the Cincinnati

References

External links
 

 
Lineage societies